These seats were due to have been contested in 2020, but the elections were delayed by a year due to the COVID-19 pandemic.

Results

Council Composition
Following the last election in 2019, the composition of the council was:

After the election, the composition of the council was:

Grn - Green

Ward results
Incumbent councillors are denoted by an asterisk (*)

Alfreton

Belper Central

Belper North

Codnor and Waingroves

Heage and Ambergate

Heanor and Loscoe

Heanor East

Heanor West

Ironville and Riddings

Kilburn, Denby and Holbrook

Langley Mill and Aldercar

Ripley

Ripley and Marehay

Shipley Park, Horsley and Horsley Woodhouse

Somercotes

 

Only one seat was due to be up for election during this cycle, but a second seat (due up in 2022) was contested due to the death of the sitting councillor

References

Amber Valley
2021
2020s in Derbyshire